Ezra Orion (1934–2015) was an Israeli sculptor.

Biography
Ezra Orion was born on Kibbutz Beit Alfa. The family moved to Kibbutz Ramat Yohanan when he was five. In 1952, he attended the Bezalel Academy of Art and Design in Jerusalem but left after a year of studies to enlist in the Israel Defense Forces. From 1964 to 1967, he attended the Central Saint Martins College of Art and Design and the Royal College of Art in London. 
 
Orion lived and worked at Midreshet Ben-Gurion in Sde Boker. 
Orion describes his geologic structures as “launching pads” for the mind.  In the late 1980s, he executed an "Intergalactic Sculpture" by sending a Laser beam to the Milky Way under the auspices of the Israeli Space Agency and the Israel Museum.

Further reading

 Orion, Ezra, Sculpture in the Solar System: From Geologically Based Earthworks to Astro-Sculpture in Leonardo, Vol. 18, No. 3 (1985), pp. 157–160.
Orion, Ezra, Intergalactic Sculpture toward the Third Millenium, self-published in 2001.
 Zalmona, Ygal, Ezra Orion/Tectonic Sculpture, Yeda Sela, 1982.
 Kedar, Dorit. Conversation with Ezra Orion, Psifas Autumn 1994, Number 25, Pg. 34-35.

References

External links 

Jewish Israeli artists
Israeli conceptual artists
Israeli contemporary artists
Modern sculptors
Bezalel Academy of Arts and Design alumni
2015 deaths
1934 births